Kevin Mark Levrone (born July 16, 1964) is an American IFBB professional bodybuilder, IFBB Hall of Famer, musician and blogger.

During his professional career, Levrone competed in 68 IFBB Professional contests. Considered one of the best bodybuilders of the 1990s, despite never winning the Mr. Olympia title, he has won 20 pro shows with three amateur wins. Holding the record of the most wins as an IFBB professional until 2001 when Vince Taylor won his 21st pro win, taking the title of Masters Olympia. Ronnie Coleman set the new record in 2004 and that record was eventually broken by Dexter Jackson in 2016 with 29 wins.

Early life

Levrone was born on July 16, 1964, in Baltimore, Maryland, to an Italian-American father (originally from Sicily) and African-American mother. He lost both parents to cancer at a young age. Kevin was first inspired to pursue bodybuilding by his cousin. After seeing the size and condition of his cousin, who had returned from serving in the military, Kevin became more serious about working out and bodybuilding in general.

Training and Competition 
Levrone began his professional IFBB career in 1991 after finishing first in the NPC Finals. After placing 2nd at the 1992 Mr. Olympia contest, for his first participation, he had a severe injury in February 1993, completely tearing his major and minor pectorals while bench-pressing 600 pounds, and he needed surgery to reattach them. He had two surgeries, the first one lasted 8 hours, then while he was healing he got an infection and he needed a second surgery. At that time everyone thought that Levrone's career was over, yet he managed to be in contest shape for the 1994 Mr. Olympia only eight weeks later, and placed 3rd. He placed 2nd at Mr. Olympia four times—in 1992 and 1995 behind Dorian Yates (six times winner), in 2000 and 2002 behind Ronnie Coleman (eight times winner).

When he stopped competing in 2003, Levrone did not officially announce his retirement; he explained this as he never thought about retirement, but just decided to do something different and find other challenges.

Despite having been away from competition for well over a decade since 2003, Kevin officially announced in May 2016 that he would return to once again compete at the professional level at the Mr. Olympia contest, by special invite; he indeed entered the 2016 Mr. Olympia contest, at age 51, and placed 17th, with only five months of preparation. In 2018, in the lead up to competing in the Arnold Classic Australia competition, Levrone announced that this would be his last competition; he placed 13th out of a field of 14. Many believe he had improved over his 2016 Mr Olympia condition, but he was still far from the condition that had made him a big name in bodybuilding in the 90s and early 2000s.

Levrone has qualified and participated in 13 Mr. Olympia competitions (including a special invite from IFBB Presiden Jim Manion for the 2016 edition). He's placed 2nd four times, once making his Olympia debut in 1995 to Dorian Yates. 3 times to Ronnie Coleman(98, 2000, 2002). Due to his popularity and close calls he has been given the title of an uncrowned Mr.Olympia (an honorary title he shares with Kenneth “Flex” Wheeler and Shawn Ray). Levrone has been applauded for his ability to train quickly for competitions, rather than training year-long. This fact is often attributed to the reason why he was able to come back for the 2016 Mr. Olympia competition. Despite not placing in the top 10 for the first time, Levrone got himself in competition-shape in only 5 months. After the 2016 Mr. Olympia competition Levrone revealed he had trained despite injuries to his pectorals and knee.

Post professional career
Since ending his competition career, Levrone enjoys playing other sports like tennis and golf. He has acted in several films and is also a musician. He released an online training platform in early 2016 naming it TeamLevrone.com. In 2015, he released a supplement line called, "Kevin Levrone Signature Series".

Stats
Height: 1.79 m (5 ft 11 in)
On Season Weight:  (post active competitive career)
Off Season Weight:  (peak during active competitive career)
Competition Weight: 
Arm Size:  (active peak)
Leg Size:  
Calves Size: 49,53 cm (19.5 in)
Waist Size: 
Chest size: 
Best Bench Press: (RAW, i.e. unequipped, with belt and for reps)

Competitive history

 1991 Junior Nationals – NPC, HeavyWeight, 2nd
 1991 Nationals – NPC, HeavyWeight, 1st
 1991 Nationals – NPC, Overall Winner
 1992 Grand Prix Germany, 1st
 1992 Grand Prix England, 2nd
 1992 Chicago Pro Invitational, 3rd
 1992 Night of Champions, 1st
 1992 Mr. Olympia, 2nd
 1993 Grand Prix France, 5th
 1993 Grand Prix Finland, 2nd
 1993 Grand Prix Spain, 3rd
 1993 Grand Prix Germany, 1st
 1993 Mr. Olympia, 5th
 1993 Grand Prix England, 3nd
 1994 San Jose Pro Invitational, 1st
 1994 Grand Prix France (2), 1st
 1994 Grand Prix Italy, 1st
 1994 Arnold Classic, 1st
 1994 Mr. Olympia, 3rd
 1994 Grand Prix Spain, 2nd
 1994 Grand Prix Germany, 2nd
 1994 Grand Prix England, 2nd
 1995 Mr. Olympia, 2nd
 1995 Grand Prix Spain, 1st
 1995 Grand Prix Germany, 1st
 1995 Grand Prix England, 2nd
 1995 Grand Prix Russia, 1st
 1996 San Jose Pro Invitational, 1st
 1996 Arnold Classic, 1st
 1996 San Francisco Pro Invitational, 1st
 1996 Mr. Olympia, 3rd
 1996 Grand Prix Spain, 3rd
 1996 Grand Prix Germany, 4th
 1996 Grand Prix England, 4th
 1996 Grand Prix Czech Republic, 2nd
 1996 Grand Prix Switzerland, 3rd
 1996 Grand Prix Russia, 5th
 1997 Arnold Classic, 8th
 1997 Mr. Olympia, 4th
 1997 Grand Prix Hungary, 1st
 1997 Grand Prix Spain, 1st
 1997 Grand Prix Germany, 1st
 1997 Grand Prix England, 1st
 1997 Grand Prix Czech Republic, 1st
 1997 Grand Prix Finland, 1st
 1997 Grand Prix Russia, 2nd
 1998 San Francisco Pro Invitational, 1st
 1998 Toronto Pro Invitational, 2nd
 1998 Night of Champions, 2nd
 1998 Mr. Olympia, 4th
 1998 Grand Prix Germany, 2nd
 1998 Grand Prix Finland, 2nd
 1999 Arnold Classic, 2nd
 1999 Mr. Olympia, 4th
 1999 World Pro Championships, 3rd
 1999 Grand Prix England, 3rd
 2000 Arnold Classic, 3rd
 2000 Mr. Olympia, 2nd
 2001 Mr. Olympia, 3rd
 2001 Grand Prix England, 1st
 2002 Arnold Classic, 5th
 2002 Grand Prix Australia, 4th
 2002 Mr. Olympia, 2nd
 2003 Arnold Classic, 5th
 2003 Mr. Olympia, 6th
 2003 Show of Strengths Pro Championship, 3rd
2016 Mr. Olympia, 17th
 2018 Arnold Classic Australia, 13th

References

External links
Levrone on iTunes

1964 births
African-American bodybuilders
American bodybuilders
American people of Italian descent
Living people
Professional bodybuilders
Sportspeople from Baltimore
21st-century African-American people
20th-century African-American sportspeople